Argentina held national parliamentary elections on Sunday, 23 October 2005. For the purpose of these elections, each of the 23 provinces and the Autonomous City of Buenos Aires are considered electoral districts.

Each district elected a number of members of the Lower House (the Argentine Chamber of Deputies) roughly proportional to their population. Eight districts (Buenos Aires, Formosa, Jujuy, La Rioja, Misiones, San Juan, San Luis, and Santa Cruz) also elected members to the Upper House of Congress (the Argentine Senate); as usual, three senators were elected (two for the majority, one for the first minority).

In most provinces, the national elections were conducted in parallel with local ones, whereby a number of municipalities elected legislative officials (concejales) and in some cases also a mayor (or the equivalent executive post). Each provincial election followed local regulations.

A number of districts had held primary elections beforehand. In most cases, primary elections are optional and can be called for by the local political parties as needed; in Santa Fe, however, the primaries were universal and compulsory due to a recent law that repealed the much-criticized Ley de Lemas.

Background
The main parties and coalitions competing in these elections were:

 President Kirchner's faction of Peronism, called Frente para la Victoria (FV, "Front for Victory") and its allies.
 Other factions of Peronism, under the usual name Partido Justicialista (PJ, "Justicialist Party"), often led by their respective provincial party leaders (notably Eduardo Duhalde in Buenos Aires Province).
 Unión Cívica Radical (UCR, "Radical Civic Union").
 Afirmación Para Una República Igualitaria (ARI, "Support for an Egalitarian Republic"), led by Elisa Carrió.
 Recrear para el Crecimiento (Recreate for Growth, usually shortened to Recrear) and its allies within the Propuesta Republicana (Republican Proposal, PRO) front.
 Partido Socialista (PS, Socialist Party).

In some districts, different factions of the Justicialist Party (PJ) presented candidates separately. In Buenos Aires Province and the city of Buenos Aires, the main intra-party division of the PJ was between the center-right, traditional Peronist faction led by Hilda González de Duhalde (wife of former governor and interim president Eduardo Duhalde), and the more center-left "heterodox" faction with candidates that answer to President Néstor Kirchner. These included his own wife, Cristina Fernández de Kirchner, and Minister of Foreign Relations, Rafael Bielsa. In the Province of Buenos Aires, this split was protested by other parties, on the grounds that the PJ (taken as a whole) would most likely win the three senatorial benches available (as it finally occurred).

Kirchner took a prominent role in the campaign for "his" candidates of the Front for Victory (Frente para la Victoria, FV) in most provinces, explicitly stating that these elections were a referendum on his administration. Kirchner also campaigned against former President Carlos Menem, a leading conservative Peronist, in La Rioja Province, where the latter was ultimately elected to the Senate for the third (minority party) seat. The opening and closing campaign meetings of the FV were both held in Rosario, a typically progressive city that, since 1987, had been governed successfully by a Socialist local government. This party changed the traditional electoral paradigm in the Province of Santa Fe, largely displacing Peronism and the UCR in that district.

Results

Buoyed by a strong recovery in the Argentine economy, candidates endorsed by Kirchner (mainly on the Front for Victory ticket) obtained an overwhelming triumph. Of the 127 deputies elected, the FV won 69 seats (54%); the UCR only got 19. The rest of the Justicialist Party obtained 11 seats; Recrear got 9, the ARI got 8, and the Socialist Party got 5. Only the three most voted in this list have an established national structure; Recrear and the ARI are relatively recent offshoots of the UCR (to the right- and left-wing side of the political spectrum, respectively), and the Socialist Party's five deputies all belong to the province of Santa Fe, the only district where the PS is strong.

As explained above, eight provinces were also scheduled to renew their senators (the Senate is renewed by thirds every two years). The Front for Victory won 17 of the 24 senatorial seats. The other factions of Peronism got 4 senators. The UCR got the remaining 3 seats. Among the remarkable results were the victory of First Lady Cristina Fernández de Kirchner in Buenos Aires, the largest in the country, beating former First Lady Hilda González de Duhalde by about 25% of the votes; and the defeat of Carlos Menem in his home district, La Rioja (though he won the first minority seat).

Chamber of Deputies

Senate

Notes

References

 
 
 
 
 
 
 
 
 
 
 
 
 
 
 
 
 
 
 
 
 
 
 
 
 
 

2005
2005 elections in Argentina
Presidency of Néstor Kirchner